Three Cheers for Sweet Revenge (often shortened to Three Cheers or Revenge) is the second studio album by American rock band My Chemical Romance, released on June 8, 2004, by Reprise Records. With this album, the band produced a cleaner sound than that of their 2002 debut I Brought You My Bullets, You Brought Me Your Love. It was the band's first release to feature rhythm guitarist Frank Iero on all tracks, as well as the final release to feature drummer Matt Pelissier, who would later be replaced by Bob Bryar.

The album was a success for both the band and the label. The record produced four singles—"I'm Not Okay (I Promise)", "Helena", "The Ghost of You", and in the United Kingdom, "Thank You for the Venom". It was certified platinum less than a year after its release, and has sold over three million copies in the United States.

Music and lyrical themes
Musically, Three Cheers for Sweet Revenge has been described as alternative rock, emo, pop-punk, post-hardcore, and punk rock. While I Brought You My Bullets, You Brought Me Your Love was considered "a particularly strident entry in that shifty genre of bands tortuously slamming together elements of emo, hardcore, and even metal", Three Cheers for Sweet Revenge "both showcased their songwriting skills and gave them much-deserved attention". Moving away from the "screamo parts" and "the more complicated structures" of their first record in favor of a sound that "skirts the line between pop punk and edgy, theatrical, emo" while being "strongly influenced by hardcore punk", Three Cheers for Sweet Revenge has been variously compared to The Misfits, AFI, and Thursday.

Lead singer Gerard Way has referred to the first single "I'm Not Okay (I Promise)" as a "self help pop song" while also being called "a surging piece of emo-pop with a hook as ridiculously catchy as it was ridiculous" and a "moving anthem for the young and depressed" by AllMusic and Rolling Stone respectively. This single went on to be nominated for the Kerrang! award for best single and reached number 86 on the US Billboard Hot 100.

The album opener "Helena" has been referred to as an "album highlight and smash hit". Gerard has claimed that the song "shaped what the album is about" and "revealed their dark side" in comparison to the first single. Its lyrics mourn the loss of Gerard and Mikey's grandmother, Elena Lee Rush, and was their first entry into the top 40.

Album concept

According to Way, the album can be understood as a "pseudo-conceptual horror story", that details:

...the story of a man and a woman who are separated by death in a gunfight and he goes to hell only to realize by the devil telling him that she's still alive. The devil says he can be with her again if he brings the devil the souls of a thousand evil men and the man agrees to do it, and so the devil hands him a gun. That was the idea behind the concept, the record ended up being much more about loss and real life than anything, so I would say it's a good split.

Reception

Johnny Loftus of AllMusic wrote that "with the aid of production major-leaguer Howard Benson, they've edited the slight rookie excesses of I Brought You My Bullets You Brought Me Your Love, resulting in a rewarding, pretty damn relentless product." Andy Greenwald of Blender noted Way's integration of elements of his life into the songs on the album and remarked that his "gulping, gasping whine turns stompers like 'I’m Not Okay (I Promise)' into after-school poetry". Ian Mathers of Stylus Magazine felt that the album contained "twelve near-flawless songs and an interlude in thirty-nine minutes" and that "even when it lets up, [it] doesn’t let up", while Kirk Miller of Rolling Stone described it as "a hell of a good time." IGN critic JR was more reserved in his praise, calling Three Cheers for Sweet Revenge "a good album" that nonetheless "isn't nearly as varied or daring as it could have been". In The Village Voice, Robert Christgau gave it a "dud" rating.

Accolades

Legacy
NME listed the album as one of "20 Emo Albums That Have Resolutely Stood the Test of Time". The album was ranked at number 260 on Spins "The 300 Best Albums of the Past 30 Years (1985–2014)" list. Rock Sound wrote that the album is "an era-defining release", striking "a nerve both musically and emotionally with millions around the world."

In 2016, Rolling Stone declared Three Cheers for Sweet Revenge the tenth greatest emo album out of 40, saying that "Three Cheers wasn't just a concept record, it was a concept sequel, expanding the small-screen story of 2002's I Brought You My Bullets, You Brought Me Your Love into a big-budget production, complete with ruminations on life and death ("Helena") biting kiss-offs ("I'm Not Okay") and a series of dramatic music videos that made them MTV darlings."

In May 2020, The Forty-Five declared "I'm Not Okay (I Promise)" the greatest emo track of all time.

Three Cheers for Sweet Revenge has sold over three million copies to date in the United States and has been certified 3× platinum by the RIAA as of December 2017. By February 2006, the album had sold over 1,356,000 copies in the US and 3 million copies to date. It has also been certified Platinum in Canada and the UK, and Gold in Ireland, Chile and Argentina.

Track listing

Standard edition

 Track 11 listed as "It's Not a Fashion Statement, It's a Fucking Deathwish" in the album liner notes

Japanese special edition DVD

Personnel

My Chemical Romance
Gerard Way - lead and backing vocals
Ray Toro - lead guitar, backing vocals
Frank Iero - rhythm guitar, backing vocals 
Mikey Way - bass guitar
Matt Pelissier - drums, percussion 

Additional musicians
Bert McCracken – additional vocals on "You Know What They Do to Guys Like Us in Prison"
Keith Morris – additional vocals on "Hang 'Em High"
Rinat – additional vocals on "The Ghost of You"
Howard Benson – 1958 Hammond B3

Production

Howard Benson – producer, mixing
Rich Costey – mixing
Craig Aaronson – A&R
Brian Schechter – management
Stacy Fass – legal
Matt Galle – booking
Mike Plotnikoff  – recording
Eric J. Miller – additional engineering
Paul Decarli – Pro Tools and programming
Jon Nicholson – drum tech
Keith Nelson – guitar tech
Howard Benson – 1958 Hammond B3
Tom Baker – mastering
Matt Griffen – production coordinator
Dana Childs – production coordinator
Arturo Rojas – runner
Fernando Diaz – runner
Mike Gardner – runner
Chris Ozuna – runner
Bryan Mansell – runner
Mark Holley – design assistance

Charts

Weekly charts

Year-end charts

Singles

Certifications

Release history

References

Sources

External links

Three Cheers for Sweet Revenge at YouTube (streamed copy where licensed)

2004 albums
My Chemical Romance albums
Emo albums by American artists
Pop punk albums by American artists
Albums produced by Howard Benson
Reprise Records albums